The 2002–03 Ukrainian Second League was the 12th season of 3rd level professional football in Ukraine.

The competitions were divided into three groups according to geographical location in the country – A is western Ukraine, B is southern Ukraine and Crimea, and C is eastern Ukraine.

The groups were won respectively by FC LUKOR Kalush, FC Nafkom-Academia Irpin and FC Zorya Luhansk.

Team changes

Promoted
The following team was promoted from the 2002 Ukrainian Football Amateur League:
 FC Systema KKhP Chernyakhiv – (debut)
 FC Shakhtar Luhansk – (debut)
 FC Yavir Krasnopilya – (debut, reinstated  in 2000 in place of FC Yavir–Sumy)

The 2001 Ukrainian Football Amateur League participant:
 FC Vuhlyk Dymytrov – (debut)

Also, one more club was admitted additionally:
 PFC Sevastopol – (debut, last season Sevastopol was represented by FC Chayka-VMS Sevastopol)

Relegated
 FC Nyva Ternopil – (debut, previously (11 seasons ago) played in the 1991 Soviet Second League as Nyva Ternopil)
 FC Elektrometalurh-NZF Nikopol – (debut, previously (13 seasons ago) played in the 1989 Soviet Second League as Kolos Nikopol)
 FC Dnipro-2 Dnipropetrovsk – (returning after an absence of 2 seasons)

Withdrew
 FC Dynamo Lviv
 FC SKA-Orbita Lviv
 FC Zakarpattia-2 Uzhhorod
 FC Cherkasy
 FC Portovyk Illichivsk
 FC Mashynobudivnyk Druzhkivka
 FC Stal-2 Alchevsk

Renamed
 FC Krystal Kherson changed its name to SC Kherson.
 FC Metalurh-2 Mariupol changed its name to FC Illichivets-2 Mariupol.

Changed groups
 FC Dynamo-3 Kyiv moved from B to A
 FC Torpedo Zaporizhzhia moved from C to B

Group A

Location map

Final standings

Top goalscorers

Group B

Location map

Final standings

Top goalscorers

Group C

Location map

Final standings

Top goalscorers

External links
 2002-03 season by Oleksiy Kobyzev

Ukrainian Second League seasons
3
Ukra